The Engineers and the Price System, by Thorstein Veblen, is a compilation of a series of papers originally published in The Dial in 1919, each of which mainly analyzes and criticizes the price system, planned obsolescence, and artificial scarcity. The final chapter outlined a plan for a "soviet of technicians".

References 

Books critical of capitalism
1921 non-fiction books
Thorstein Veblen